Qingdao University of Science and Technology (acronym QUST) is a university located in Qingdao, China, colloquially known as Qingkeda. Having evolved from a college specializing in the chemical industry, it is now a comprehensive, multi-disciplinary university offering academic degrees in Science, Technology, Humanities, Business, Management, Medicine, Law and Arts. The school encompasses three campuses in Sifang and Laoshan districts of Qingdao and Gaomi district of Weifang.

History
The origin of the university lies in the Shenyang Light Industry Vocational School which was founded in 1950. For that purpose, the government of the Northeast Region choose to put the premises of the Shenyang Wenhui Middle School, a catholic school operating since 1876, to new use. Since being run by the Christian Church meant that the Wenhui School had soon to close, an agreement was reached beforehand in order to ensure the transition of both the teaching staff and the students. In accordance with the economic needs of the time, chemistry, paper making and rubber production made up the core curriculum for the higher education branch, while the former middle school continued its operation under the auspices of this new institution. The first three vocational classes enrolled in October 1950, numbering 128 students in total.

The school didn't remain in Shenyang for long. In December 1954, the Ministry of Light Industry decided to move the whole institution to Qingdao, where more expertise was needed to further the development of the local rubber-industry. Thus, in September 1956 the Qingdao Rubber Industry School opened its gates, having moved teachers, students and equipment from Liaoning to Shandong Province. During those years, the area lay at the outskirts of the city proper and was far from being urbanized. In 1958, under the name Shandong College of Chemical Industry, it became directly subordinated to the Ministry of Chemical Industry and given the right to award bachelor's degrees. During the Cultural Revolution, the college suffered a sharp decline in the range of subjects to only three, namely Rubber Machinery, Chemical Machinery and Rubber Products, in 1968. The length of studies was also shortened to only two years, and in 1972, it was required for the school to recruit workers, peasants and soldiers as students. Things started to look brighter in 1977, when the Gaokao was reinstated as prerequisite to higher education, and the college was able to enroll 443 new students for Bachelor-level studies.

The right to recruit student for master's degrees in technical fields was awarded in 1980. Distance education was introduced in 1981, starting with 91 students at the time. Since 1985 the college was called Qingdao Institute of Chemical Industry, a change of name that was considered a downgrade by a lot of students and teachers alike and thus not warmly welcomed. Contrary to the reservations expressed at the time, it didn't harm the institutions further development of the institution. On the contrary was the range of subjects steadily expanded in the following decades, including the expansion from three to six faculties, including Foreign Languages and Computer Sciences, in 1993, bringing the number of students close to 3,963 and the number of bachelor courses to 17. Another big step towards a comprehensive university was done with the incorporation of the Qingdao Arts and Crafts School in 2001. That same year, the number of students reached 10,747. The biggest change and expansion yet followed in 2002, when full university status was granted and the school adopted its current and final name, Qingdao University of Science and Technology. In September 2002, the new campus in Laoshan was inaugurated. In 2006, the College of Communication and Animation was opened and several language majors added to the School of Foreign Languages. A third campus was opened in 2009 in Gaomi, marking the expansion of the university beyond the borders of Qingdao. The establishment of a Middle School Affiliated to Qingdao University of Science and Technology in Laoshan district commenced in 2014.

Academics
Qingdao University of Science and Technology is one of the nine Provincial Key Universities of Shandong. It was ranked 45th among engineering universities on the Mainland in 2013. In 2011, it was included in the first national Excellence Plan for Engineering Education. The three campuses together cover an area of 700,000 m2. The total value of fixed assets is estimated at 2,200 billion yuan. Spread over five branches, the foundation of the University Library dates back to 1950. It now covers a building area of around 50,000m2 and contains over 2.4 million volumes, including digital ones.

The university offers three first level and 22 second level doctoral programs and four postdoctoral research stations, 20 first level and 125 second level master programs and 68 undergraduate programs. Chemistry and materials science are the most renowned majors offered, with the Key Laboratory of Rubber-plastics as well as the Key Laboratory of Eco-chemical Engineering of the Ministry of Education being hosted by the university. Several post-doctoral programs in those fields are also available. Joint research centers have been set up with several international companies, including the LANXESS Rubber Research Center Qingdao.

Five majors are accredited as being distinguished on a national level, those include:

Chemical Engineering and Technology
Applied Chemistry
Polymer Materials and Engineering
Mechanical Engineering and Automation,
Process Equipment and Control Engineering

The aforementioned as well as the following majors are accredited as being distinguished on a provincial level:
Materials Chemistry
Automation
Electronic Information Engineering
Business Administration
English Language Studies

The university is an official test center for the TOEIC and the Italian language CELI exam.

Sifang Campus

The oldest campus of the university is located in Sifang district near the eastern end of Jiaozhou Bay Bridge. It is renowned for its beautiful main building, which was built in 1956 and inspired by the soviet architecture of the time. Most majors that form the core profile of the university are still based in Sifang. A large cluster of high-end chemical and rubber industries, the so-called Rubber Valley, is located adjacent to the campus, as is the science park of the university.
College of Chemical Engineering 化工学院
College of Chemistry and Molecular Engineering 化学与分子工程学院
School of Polymer Science and Engineering 高分子科学与工程学院
College of Materials Science and Engineering 材料科学与工程学院
College of Environment and Safety Engineering 环境与安全工程学院
College of Adult Vocational Education 成教学院高职学院

Laoshan Campus

The biggest in area campus was inaugurated in 2002. It is located in near many tourist hotspots, including Mount Lao (Lauschan) and the Shilaoren Beach. In addition to the faculties that were added as part of the transition into a comprehensive university, Laoshan Campus also includes the main administration and library. While construction of the southern part of the campus, called Nanyuan, was already finished in the years following its inauguration, the campus district of Beiyuan was opened in 2012 and is still being expanded.

College of Electromechanical Engineering 机电工程学院
College of Mathematics 数理学院
School of Information Sciences and Technology 信息科学技术学院
School of Foreign Languages 外国语学院
College of Economics and Management 经济与管理学院
College of the Arts 艺术学院
College of Communication and Animation 传播与动漫学院
College of Marxism 马克思主义学院
Law School 政法学院
Department of Sports 体育教学部
Sino-German Technology College 中德科技学院
College of International Cooperation 国际合作学院
College of Automation and Electronic Engineering 自动化与电子工程学院

Gaomi Campus
Several branches of the main faculties are located at Gaomi Campus, with most majors offered in Economics, Chemical and Computer sciences. The courses for Associates degree level of studies are also based here, with 22 majors offered in total. 4,000 students are enrolled and 260 teacher employed in Gaomi. Same as in Laoshan, this campus is also undergoing further construction.
Qingdao University of Science and Technology, Gaomi Campus 青岛科技大学高密校区

International cooperation

Qingdao University of Science and Technology has a strong partnership with the University of Paderborn, Germany, that has resulted in the establishment of the Sino-German Technology College on Laoshan Campus. Students who pass the requirements set by the universities and the DAAD can finish their Bachelor-studies in several German universities and have the opportunity to do a master's degree there. Cooperation agreements exist with over 60 educational institutions in 16 countries and territories. Universities that have an agreement on teachers exchange with QUST include:

 City University of Hong Kong, Hong Kong, China
 Regensburg University of Applied Sciences, Germany
 Institute of the Pacific United New Zealand, New Zealand
 Tambov State Technical University, Russia
 Kongju National University, South Korea
 Kangnam University, South Korea

Affiliated institutions

QUST is unique among universities in Shandong in that it directly sponsor a professional football team, Qingdao University of Science and Technology F.C. QUST has competed in the China League Two and in 2009 made it into the quarter-finals. In addition, the university is also in charge of the Qingdao Sea Eagles F.C. that compete in the local Qingdao league. A large number of enterprises, mostly in the rubber and plastics industry, are affiliated to the university.

Notable faculty and alumni
Wang Zhongyu (1933- ), Governor of Jilin Province from 1989 to 1992, graduated in 1953
Mo Yan (1955- ), novelist and short story writer, winner of Nobel Prize in Literature 2012, visiting professor since 2011
Wang Tianpu (1962- ), president of Sinopec Corporation, graduated with a Bachelor of Engineering in 1985

References

External links
Qingdao University of Science and Technology website 
Qingdao University of Science and Technology website 
Key Laboratory of Rubber-plastics website 
Rubber Valley Company website 

Universities and colleges in Qingdao
Technical universities and colleges in China
Educational institutions established in 1950
1950 establishments in China